Pavel Sergeyevich Kochetkov (born 7 March 1986 in Kamensk-Uralsky) is a Russian cyclist, who currently rides for UCI ProTeam .

On 5 March 2014, he fractured his collarbone after a low-flying helicopter knocked him off his bike during the Stage 7 of the Tour de Langkawi. He was named in the start list for the 2015 Vuelta a España. In July 2018, he was named in the start list for the 2018 Tour de France.

Major results

2007
 1st Circuito Internazionale di Caneva
 1st Stage 4 Giro delle Regioni
 2nd Giro Ciclistico del Pinerolese
 3rd Gran Premio di Poggiana
 6th Coppa della Pace
 8th Ruota d'Oro
2008
 1st Trofeo Marco Rusconi
 3rd Gran Premio di Poggiana
 3rd Trofeo Alcide Degasperi
 3rd Trofeo Salvatore Morucci
 4th La Côte Picarde
 5th GP Capodarco
 6th Ronde van Vlaanderen U23
 7th Lombardia Tour
 8th Coppa della Pace
2009
 1st Trofeo Città di San Vendemiano
 1st Trofeo Alcide Degasperi
 1st Freccia dei Vini
 1st GP Inda
 2nd Overall Giro della Regione Friuli Venezia Giulia
 2nd Coppa della Pace
 6th Gara Ciclistica Millionaria
 9th Overall Giro della Valle d'Aosta
2010
 4th Grand Prix Südkärnten
2011
 1st Stage 1 Tour of Bulgaria
 7th Overall Tour des Pays de Savoie
1st Stage 1
 9th Overall Grand Prix of Sochi
2012
 2nd Overall Czech Cycling Tour
1st  Points classification
 2nd Memorial Oleg Dyachenko
 3rd Central European Tour Košice–Miskolc
 4th Overall Tour du Loir-et-Cher
 7th Overall Circuit des Ardennes
1st Stage 3 (TTT)
 10th Duo Normand (with Vyacheslav Kuznetsov)
2014
 10th Overall Tour de Wallonie
2015
 3rd Tour of Almaty
 Giro d'Italia
Held  after Stages 3–4
2016
 1st  Road race, National Road Championships
 8th Overall Tour of Slovenia

Grand Tour general classification results timeline

References

External links
 

1986 births
Living people
Russian male cyclists
Cyclists at the 2016 Summer Olympics
Olympic cyclists of Russia
Cyclists at the 2015 European Games
European Games competitors for Russia
People from Kamensk-Uralsky
Sportspeople from Sverdlovsk Oblast
21st-century Russian people